Mauro Libertella (born 1983) is an Argentinian writer. He was born in Mexico City and grew up in Buenos Aires. He studied literature at university, before pursuing a career as a journalist and fiction writer. He has published five books to date. In 2017, he was named as one of the Bogota39, a list of the best young writers in Latin America.

Books
 Un hombre entre paréntesis, NON FICTION, 2019
 Un reino demasiado breve, NOVEL, 2017
 El invierno con mi generación, NOVEL, 2015
 El estilo de otros, NON FICTION, 2015
 Mi libro enterrado, NOVEL, 2013

References

Argentine writers
1983 births
Living people